Philippe Latulippe, better known as Phil Latulippe (born March 16, 1919 in Cabano, Quebec - d. September 24, 2006), C.M., C.Q., M.M.M., C.D., was a Canadian soldier, athlete and philanthropist.

He served as a professional soldier in the Canadian Armed Forces from 1940 to 1974.  He was wounded to the legs in the Second World War.  He began training in track and field at age 48.  After his military career, he became well known as a record-breaking marathon runner and as an advocate of running and physical exercise in general. Between the ages of 49 and 76, he ran 210782 km. The notice for the Order of Canada mentions that "for nearly 20 years he has proceeded from record to record, whether in walking or cross-country skiing, never for his own profit but always for a deserving charity. He continues to devote himself body and soul to assisting the disabled, young people and the elderly.".  In 1981, he created the Phil-et-Lucie-Latulippe Foundation to encourage the practice of walking, in particular for children and handicapped people, in Canada and abroad. He was also involved in several humanitarian causes.  His actions and his work earned him several awards.

A biography, L'homme qui est allé au bout des routes, was published in 1995. He suffered a stroke in 2002, but still continued to walk 6 km per day.  He died in 2006.  The Complexe sportif Phil-Latulippe, a sports center, is named in his honor in Loretteville (Québec), where he resided for many years.

Awards 
1939–45 Star
France and Germany Star
Medal of Normandy
War Medal 1939–1945
Canadian Volunteer Service Medal 1939-1945
1967 - Canadian Centennial Medal
1968 - 'Member of the Order of Saint John of Jerusalem
1973 - Member of the Order of Military Merit
1977 - Queen Elizabeth II Silver Jubilee Medal
1984 - Member of the Order of Canada
1992 - 125th Anniversary of the Confederation of Canada Medal
2004 - Knight of the National Order of Quebec
Medal of the Université du Québec à Rimouski

References

1919 births
2006 deaths
Canadian Army personnel
Canadian Army personnel of World War II
Canadian male long-distance runners
Knights of the National Order of Quebec
Members of the Order of Canada
Members of the Order of Military Merit (Canada)
Canadian military personnel from Quebec